The Sind Division was the name an administrative division of British India located in Sindh.

History
The territory was annexed by the Bombay Presidency of British India on 17 February 1843, following a British Indian conquest led by then Major-General Charles Napier in order to quell the insurrection of Sindhi rulers who had remained hostile to the British Empire following the First Anglo-Afghan War.  Napier's campaign against these chieftains resulted in the victories of the Battle of Miani and the Battle of Hyderabad.

The Sind Division was separated from the Bombay Presidency on 1 April 1936 and the region became the Sind Province.

See also
History of Sindh
Peccavi

References

Divisions of British India
Historical Indian regions
History of Sindh
Bombay Presidency
1843 establishments in British India